Dan Johnson (born May 17, 1960) is a former professional American football player who played tight end for seven seasons for the Miami Dolphins.  Before his NFL career, Jonson played college football at Iowa State University.  He did not play until his Junior season, and caught only 4 passes that year (though they were good for 116 yards and two touchdowns).  As a senior, Johnson caught 21 passes for 290 yards.  He was later selected by Miami with their 7th round pick in the 1983 NFL draft.

Johnson told ESPN's John Barr on January 28, 2011, that he took about 1000 pain killers per month during his playing days, as a result of the numerous injuries and broken bones he suffered.  Teammates nicknamed him "King of Pain" as a result of all the broken bones he had during his career. He was also the only player to catch a touchdown pass from Hall of Fame quarterback Dan Marino in Super Bowl XIX.

References

1960 births
Living people
American football tight ends
Iowa State Cyclones football players
Miami Dolphins players
Players of American football from Minneapolis